Costin Romeo Curelea (born 11 July 1984) is a Romanian former footballer who played as a striker and currently he is an assistant coach at CFR Cluj.

Career
In his first league match for Sportul Studenţesc, a Liga II game against Dacia Mioveni, Costin Curelea scored two goals as Sportul won by 3 goals to 1. He played his first Liga I match against Apulum Alba Iulia, on 31 July 2004. After two months, he managed to score his first Liga I goal against FCM Bacău, in a 1–1 draw match played at Regie Stadium.

After Sportul Studenţesc was relegated due to financial reasons at the end of 2005–2006 season, Costin Curelea remained at the team, alongside Viorel Ferfelea, Dacian Varga and Tiberiu Bălan. Since then, he was often the team top-scorer. In the 2006–2007 season, Curelea scored 14 goals for his team in 29 matches.

Statistics

Statistics accurate as of match played 31 May 2017

Honours

Sportul Studențesc
Divizia B: 2003–04

Universitatea Craiova
Liga II: 2013–14

FC Voluntari
Cupa României: 2016–17

Individual
Liga II top scorer: 2006–07 (14 goals)

References

External links

 
 

1989 births
Living people
Footballers from Bucharest
Romanian footballers
Romania youth international footballers
Romania under-21 international footballers
Association football forwards
Liga I players
Liga II players
Belarusian Premier League players
FC Sportul Studențesc București players
FC Dinamo Minsk players
CS Universitatea Craiova players
FC Voluntari players
LPS HD Clinceni players
Romanian expatriate footballers
Expatriate footballers in Belarus
Romanian expatriate sportspeople in Belarus
Romania international footballers